Simon David Chapman (born 26 April 1965) is a British children's writer, explorer and science teacher. His books include the Explorers Wanted! series, of which Explorers Wanted! At the North Pole won a Blue Peter Book Award in 2005. Chapman teaches Science at Morecambe Bay Academy in Lancashire. Chapman studied Mechanical Engineering at University of Manchester.

References

External links
 
 Simon Chapman at publisher Egmont (archived 2006-10-05)
 "Morecambe High School pupils visit CERN as guests of Lancaster University's Physics Department" (18 July 2014), Science and Technology at Lancaster University
 

1965 births
British children's writers
Children's non-fiction writers
Living people
Date of birth missing (living people)
Place of birth missing (living people)